Andrei Usatîi (born 12 December 1950) is a Moldovan politician who served as the Minister of Health in Second Filat Cabinet since January 2011 to 18 February 2015.

On 2 April 2015 he was awarded „Order of Honour”.

References

 

1950 births
Living people
Moldovan physicians
Liberal Democratic Party of Moldova politicians
Moldovan Ministers of Health
People from Ialoveni District
Recipients of the Order of Honour (Moldova)